Kirk Archibeque (born September 27, 1984) is an American professional basketball player who last played for PGE Turów of the Polish Basketball League.

Career
Archibeque started played basketball for the Montezuma-Cortez High School Panthers. During his college years he moved to the University of Northern Colorado where he played with the Bears in the Big Sky Conference. Between 2003 and 2008, he played 96 games for the team. For his final college year he moved to the Fort Lewis Skyhawks, playing 34 games.

After being undrafted in 2009, he started his professional career in Eastern Europe where he played for teams from Slovakia, Poland and Georgia. In 2014, he signed with Port of Antwerp Giants in Belgium.

References

1984 births
Living people
American expatriate basketball people in Belgium
American expatriate basketball people in Georgia (country)
American expatriate basketball people in Poland
American expatriate basketball people in Slovakia
American men's basketball players
Antwerp Giants players
Basketball players from Colorado
Basket Zielona Góra players
Belfius Mons-Hainaut players
Centers (basketball)
Fort Lewis Skyhawks men's basketball players
Northern Colorado Bears men's basketball players
Rosa Radom players
People from Durango, Colorado
Turów Zgorzelec players